ABC Nantes (Amicale Basket Club de Nantes / in English: Nantes Friendly Basketball Club) or Nantes was a French professional basketball team located in the city of Nantes. Now, the club has dissolved. The position regarding the interest of basketball fans has gotten to Hermine de Nantes Atlantique which involved in LNB Pro B of the French basketball league.

History
Nantes Atlantique was owned for 18 seasons in the elite division of France (between 1953 and 1991) with a review of 145 wins, 9 draws and 190 defeats in 344 games.

Honours
French Cup (1): 1965-66

French League 2 (1): 1970-71

Notable players
  Michel Le Ray
  Louis Bertorelle
  Raphaël Ruiz
  Carmine Calzonetti
   Derrick Pope
  Andy Fields
  George Montgomery
  Larry Boston

Head coaches
Henri Manhe was a legend figure of the club. He coached Garennes and ASPTT Nantes particular, each with beautiful mounted elite with little means. Died in August 2007, it leaves its mark on the Breton basketball forever. Today, his grand-son Rodolphe resumed his legacy and his talent.

 1953-55  Robert Perkons
 1956-59  Yvan Gominon
 1959-62  Serge Kalember
 1962-69  Raphaël Ruiz
 1969-73  Christian Bayer
 1974-75  Carmine Calzonetti

Basketball teams in France
Sport in Nantes